Eigg is one of the Small Isles in the Scottish Inner Hebrides. It lies to the south of the Isle of Skye and to the north of the Ardnamurchan peninsula. Eigg generates virtually all of its electricity using renewable energy.

Eigg has been owned by the Isle of Eigg Heritage Trust since 1997, as a community ownership; another stakeholder, the Scottish Wildlife Trust, manages the island as a nature reserve. In April 2019, National Geographic discussed the island in an online article, estimating the population at 107 and the average number of annual visitors at 10,000.

Geology
The larger part of the island is formed from olivine-phyric basalt flows erupted during the Palaeocene epoch. Together with flows of hawaiite and mugearite, these form the Eigg Lava Formation. The Sgùrr is formed from porphyritic rhyolitic pitchstone erupted into a valley during the Eocene epoch. It displays columnar jointing formed as the lava cooled. Outcrops of an underlying conglomerate containing clasts of Torridonian sandstone and basalt are visible in places. These igneous and sedimentary rocks are collected together as the Sgùrr of Eigg Pitchstone Formation.

In the north of the island are a series of sedimentary rocks of Middle Jurassic and Upper Cretaceous age. The oldest of these, and hence lowest from a stratigraphic perspective is the fossiliferous Bearreraig Sandstone which is calcareous in nature. It is overlain by the Lealt Shale which consists of a lower and an upper grey shale (respectively the Kildonnan and Lonfearn members) separated by a thin band of algal limestone.

The shale is overlain by the thicker Valtos Sandstone which contains concretions. It is found along the east coast northwards from Poll nam Parlan and around the northern end and down the eastern side of the Bay of Laig.  This in turn is overlain by the bivalve-rich limestone and shale of the Duntulm Formation and lastly the dark shales and ostracod-bearing limestones of the Kilmaluag Formation.

A fossilised limb bone, considered most likely to be from a Middle Jurassic-era stegosaurian dinosaur, was discovered at a coastal exposed Valtos Sandstone Formation in 2020; it is the first confirmed dinosaur fossil to be found in Scotland away from the Isle of Skye.

These various formations are collected together as the Great Estuarine Group. The Staffin Shale which also contains siltstones, clays and limestone is found on the southwest side of Laig Bay, stratigraphically above the Great Estuarine rocks. Exposed within the Laig Gorge is the Cretaceous age Laig Gorge Limestone, the base of which is sandstone and conglomerate.

Both the igneous and the sedimentary rocks are cut through by a swarm of Palaeocene age dykes generally aligned NW-SE. A handful of faults are mapped on the same alignment, the two most significant ones stretching SE from Bay of Laig. A band of microsyenite stretches around the hillside southeast of the Sgùrr.

Isolated pockets of peat of postglacial origin are to be found behind Bay of Laig whilst to its north are areas of hummocky moraine. Landslips occupy the whole coastal strip in the northeast of the island and the embayment behind Bay of Laig and effectively mask much of the outcrop of the Mesozoic sediments.

Geography

Walkers who reach the top can, in good weather, take in views of Mull, Coll, Muck, the Outer Hebrides, Rùm, Skye, and the mountains of Lochaber on the mainland.

The plateau in the northern part of the island, at Beinn Buidhne, drops to a fertile coastal plain on its western side, containing Cleadale (cliff-valley), the main settlement on Eigg. At the southern end of the plain, in the centre of the island, lies the bay of Laig, known for its quartz beach, called the "singing sands" (Tràigh a' Bhìgeil) on account of the squeaking noise it makes if walked on when dry.

The plateau is cleaved by a central valley, stretching from the vicinity of Laig, in the north, to Galmisdale at its southeastern end, which forms the main port. Beyond the southeast coast lies the small islet of Eilean Chathastail.

Etymology
Adomnán calls the island Egea insula in his Vita Columbae (c. 700 AD). Other historical names have been Ega, Ego, Ege, Egge, Egg and Eige. A 2013 study suggested two origins: Gaelic eig, meaning "notch", or Norse egg or eggjar, meaning "a sharp edge on a mountain", as in Egge, Sogn og Fjordane.

History

Early history

At Rubh' An Tangaird, near the southern coast, there are the remains of an oval house, with thick walls, and an upright stone at each side of the doorway, suggestive of grandeur; comparable structures in Shetland suggest a neolithic date.

The island also appears to have been occupied towards the end of the neolithic era, and start of the Bronze Age, as a cache of flints has been found west of Galmisdale, including a thumbnail scraper, and a barbed-and-tanged arrowhead, typical of the Beaker People has been found to the south of Kildonan.

Later in the Bronze Age, the location of the Galmisdale cache was used for metalworking; moulds for axes and knives typical of the period from 1000 to 800 BC have been discovered there, together with significant metalworking debris.

Iron Age 

Early Iron Age hut circles are found throughout the island. One located near the North East coast contains within its bounds a cave to which walls have been artificially added; several hammerstones are located in the cave and surrounding vicinity, some with concretions of crushed shells stuck to them. The cave site is below a dramatic basalt shaft interrupting the general appearance of the cliffs, and is framed by two large boulders, one of which resembles an eagle; archaeologists have thus concluded that the site must have been regarded as special, possibly being used for hermitic purposes (being too remote and difficult to reach for ordinary domestic use), and have named the site the oracle cave.

Later in the Iron Age, the inhabitants of Eigg chose to fortify the island. More substantial Duns existed at Galmisdale Point, at Upper Grulin, and at Loch nam Ban Mora; the last of these is located on a natural island (entirely encompassed by the Dun's walls,) which local traditions claim was once inhabited by unusually large women.

Irish Christianity 

The Irish missionary activity which brought Columba to Iona also brought Donnán to Eigg, where he attempted to establish a monastery, at Kildonnan. According to traditional legends, a Pictish queen took objection to this breach of her sovereignty, and sent agents to Eigg to kill him, which they did on the eve of Easter, in 617; traditionally, Donnán had a large number of companions with him, whom he requested were killed first. Regardless of whether accounts of Donnán's death are pious forgeries or not, the monastic community continued (or was re-populated) after Donnán's death, under the authority of Iona.

By the following century, the monastery was significant enough for the death of its superior, Oan, to be mentioned in the Annals of Ulster. The monastery was located within an oval enclosure, surrounded by a ditch, housing a rectangular chapel in the centre, and a handful of smaller buildings either side. A handful of early inscribed stone slabs were located there, of which one bears a Pictish design, comprising a hunting scene; the cross on its obverse is in a style which was fashionable in the 9th century.

On the coast at the opposite side of the island, with a good view of Rùm, are 16 square cairns, lined up neatly into groups; they are each between 6 and 12 feet wide, most being bordered by a stone kerb, and some having upright corner stones. This form of cairn is usually associated with the Pictish kingdoms of Ce and Fortriu, a particularly close match being found at Garbeg, within the latter; comparable examples date to the early 8th century. The site may have some connection with the contemporary monastery at Kildonnan.

Viking Age
 

From 833, Norse settlers established the Kingdom of the Isles throughout the Hebrides. A silver/bronze sword handle from the beginning of this period was found buried near Kildonnan, together with an iron axehead, leather belt, buckle, wollen cloth, and a whetstone; the body to which these would once have belonged was absent. Wetlands near Laig appear to have been used for storing partly finished boat parts, as was common in Viking Scandinavia (moist timber is easier to modify); a few oak posts, 6 feet in length, for the stern of a longship, have been found here, together with a simple bronze brooch.

Despite being a dependency of the Norwegian king, a mid-11th century revolt by Somerled left practical authority with his heirs; the strip from Uist to the Rough Bounds, which contained the Small Isles, was ruled by the MacRory branch. In 1266, the Treaty of Perth transferred the Kingdom of the Isles to the Scottish king, while expressly preserving the power of its local rulers; the MacRory lands became the Lordship of Garmoran, a quasi-independent crown dependency, rather than an intrinsic part of Scotland.

Clan Ranald

Early rule

After nearly a century, the sole MacRory heir was Amy of Garmoran, who married John of Islay, leader of the MacDonalds, the most powerful group among Somerled's heirs. A decade later, they divorced, and John deprived his eldest son, Ranald, of the ability to inherit the MacDonald lands; as compensation, John granted Lordship of the Uists to Ranald's younger brother Godfrey, and made Ranald Lord of the remainder of Garmoran, including Eigg. At around this time, a large cross was built at Kildonnan; local traditions report that there were a series of such crosses arranged along the island, now only indicated by placenames.

Upon the death of John of Islay, Lord of the Isles, his son Donald by Princess Margaret of Scotland, Ranald's half-brother, was named The Macdonald, Donald of Islay, and Lord of the Isles at Kildonan on Eigg in 1387. Ranald agreed to this decision of his father made clear in the Charter of 1373.

However, when Ranald died, Godfrey seized his lands, leading to violent disputes between his heirs (the Siol Gorrie) and those of Ranald (Clan Ranald). In 1427, fed up with this behaviour, king James I arrested the leaders, and declared the Lordship of Garmoran forfeit. In 1469, James' grandson (James III) granted Lairdship of the lands to mainland Garmoran John of Ross, leader of the MacDonalds. In turn, John passed it to his own half-brother, Hugh of Sleat; the grant to Hugh was confirmed by the king in a 1493 charter, but Clan Ranald continued to dispute the transfer.

Following Hugh of Sleat's death in 1498, his son, John of Sleat, resigned his position, giving his lands to the king. John of Ross, though still living, had forfeited his own realm, which at the start of the 16th century led Black Donald to launch a rebellion, seeking to restore them. Unlike other descendants of John of Islay, Ranald Bane, leader of Clan Ranald, had refused to support the rebellion, so in 1505, once the rebellion was defeated, the king rewarded him with lairdship of Eigg (and Arisaig). In 1520, the excessive cruelty of Ranald Bane's son, Dougall, lead to his assassination, and leadership of Clan Ranald instead passed to Ranald Bane's brother, Alexander, and then Alexander's son, John Moidartach; in 1532, the king provided a charter confirming John's position as laird of Eigg (and Arisaig).

Writing in 1549, Donald Munro, High Dean of the Isles wrote of "Egge" that it was: "gude mayne land with ane paroch kirk in it, with mony solenne geis; very gude for store, namelie for scheip, with ane heavin for heiland Galayis".

Massacre and pillage

In 1577, according to Clan Ranald tradition, a group of MacLeods were being hosted on Eigg when they became over-amorous towards local women. As a result, the local men rounded the MacLeods up and cast them adrift in the Minch, until they were rescued by MacLeods from elsewhere. Wanting revenge, a group of MacLeods landed on Eigg, but had been spotted by the islanders, who decided to hide in an obscure cave called the Cave of Frances located on the south coast; the entrance to the cave is tiny, and was obscured by moss, undergrowth, and a small waterfall.

The traditions go on to say that the MacLeods conducted a thorough but fruitless search for the inhabitants, but after 3–5 days, just as the MacLeods were leaving, they saw someone leave the cave, and were able to follow their footprints to the entrance. The MacLeods re-directed the water, piled thatch and roof timbers at the cave entrance, and set fire to it; water dampened the flames, so that the cave was filled with smoke, asphyxiating everyone inside. 395 people had been inside; only one inhabitant of Eigg survived, an old woman, who had not sought refuge in the cave.

Serious doubts remain about the veracity of the tale; in later times a minister of Eigg stated "the less I enquired into its history ... the more I was likely to feel I knew something about it". Nonetheless, human remains inside Massacre Cave have been reported many times over the centuries; and, even though most of the remains have since been removed from the cave and reburied, natural disturbances in the soil still occasionally expose further sets of human bones.

Clan Ranald had aided the rest of Clan Donald in a longstanding feud against the MacLeans of Duart concerning the Rhinns of Islay. In 1588, some of the remains of the Spanish Armada found refuge with the MacLeans; Lachlan, the MacLean Chief, demanded that they supply soldiers in return, which he used to launch an attack against the MacDonalds. After initial failures, Lachlan chose to attack the Small Isles, as a softer, weakly defended target, instead; Eigg was burnt and pillaged. Lachlan was imprisoned in Edinburgh by the king for this, but he escaped, and faced no further punishment.

Church and reformation

Long obliged to perform penance for his part in Dougall's assassination, John Moidartach made a vow to build a number of churches, including Kildonnan Chapel. By the time it was built, the Scottish reformation had occurred, and the Kildonnan Chapel is typical of the post-Reformation style. It was built directly on top of the site of one of the earlier monastic buildings. The fate of the original monastic chapel – which lay south of this – is unclear, but the reformation may have caused it to be abandoned and dismantled; indeed, the Kildonnan Chapel itself doesn't appear to have been finished. The statutes of Iona, in 1610, had introduced a programme of government oversight of the religious behaviour of highlands leaders; the Clan Ranald leader's consent to this had resulted in the king granting him a charter confirming his lairdship of Eigg (and his other possessions).

In 1623, however, the Catholic Church in Ireland church sent Fr. Cornelius Ward, a Franciscan friar, to North Western Scotland, in order to proselytise the population. On arriving at Castle Tioram, the Captain of Clan Ranald, John MacDonald, granted him protection throughout Clan Ranald lands. In 1625, Cornelius arrived on Eigg, and reported that Kildonnan Chapel was a roofless ruin; he makes no reference to events of massacre cave, and reports the island as having 200 inhabitants, all of whom he claims to have converted to Roman Catholicism. Apparently there had been a Protestant minister on the island, but John MacDonald persuaded him to turn a blind eye, in return for the island's tithes.

Cornelius refused to reconsecrate the Chapel in its roofless state, and it came to only be used for burials. One grave had a carved cover with a roughly worked depiction of an occupant, sleeping; the portion below the waist and wrists is now missing, leading to the 17th/18th century grave slab being popularly re-interpreted as a medieval sheela na gig. The chapel also contains a Clan Ranald burial recess, dated to 1641; traditionally this is the burial place of Ranald MacDonald of Morar, a famed piper who farmed Sandavore near the end of his life, but he was not even born until 1662.

Jacobite risings

As committed Roman Catholics, Clan Ranald took part in the first Jacobite rebellion, in 1689. According to Clan Ranald tradition, in May of the following year Edward Pottinger, a Royal Navy captain from Ulster, decided to take revenge for this, by inducing his men to carry out large scale rape and murder on Eigg; the ship's log for Pottinger's ship, however, does not mention these events. To evade the religious persecution the Whig-controlled government subsequently imposed upon the Catholic Church in Scotland, the remaining Catholics of Eigg secretly attended Mass inside a large high-roofed cave, which is known as the "cave of worship" (now called Cathedral Cave).

Eigg tenants also joined the Jacobite risings of 1715 and of 1745; the Tacksman of the Eigg branch of Clan Ranald – MacDonald of Laig – also commanded the warrior-tenants from Canna (another Clan Ranald property). Whether or not the events of 1690 were simply blood libel rather than gunboat diplomacy, there was certainly retribution after the Battle of Culloden in 1746. All 38 surviving islanders who had taken part in the uprising were arrested by the Royal Navy and imprisoned in the Tower of London; though many died from natural causes, the remaining 16 were eventually sent to Barbados, to work on sugar cane plantations.

On 22 April 1751, the poet Alasdair Mac Mhaighstir Alasdair met at Leith with Bishop Robert Forbes of the Non-Juring Scottish Episcopal Church and provided the latter with a detailed account of the atrocities committed by Hanoverian redcoats on both Canna and Eigg.

For all its brutality, however, the post-Culloden history of Eigg is also important to the simultaneous golden age of Scottish Gaelic literature. After the death of his father, Raonuill Dubh MacDhòmhnuill (c.1715 - c.1805), the eldest son of legendary Gaelic poet Alasdair Mac Mhaighstir Alasdair, moved from Arisaig to become Clanranald tacksman of Laig. While serving as Tacksman, Raonuill Dubh collected and published the poetry anthology Comh-chruinneachidh Orannaigh Gaidhealach, which is also called "The Eigg Collection, at Edinburgh in 1776. Raonuill Dubh is believed to have drawn heavily upon oral poetry collected by his father and also upon a similar poetry collection made by Dr. Hector Maclean of Grulin, according to Robert Dunbar, between 1738 and 1768. The latter manuscript, which was later gifted to Canadian Gaelic poet Iain mac Ailein by the Doctor's daughter, contains an additional 104 pages of material, including fourteen of Iain mac Ailein's own poems and is now preserved in the Nova Scotia Archives.

The tack of Laig remained in the family until Raonuill Dubh MacDhòmhnuill's grandson, Angus R. MacDonald, emigrated with his mother to the United States and served as a Lieutenant in the 11th Wisconsin Regiment during the American Civil War.

Crops

The 18th century introduction of the potato to Eigg, as a food crop, lead to increased health and fecundity on the island; by the end of the century, the population had expanded to over 500 people, farming oats and cattle, in addition to potatoes. The Chief of Clan Ranald built a mill to grind the oats, and charged the islanders to use it. Since they had their own hand-querns, he instructed the Tacksman and his agents to break them, so that the islanders had no choice but to use the mill.

The outbreak of the Napoleonic Wars created a potential new route to wealth, by limiting foreign supplies of valuable minerals: kelp could be harvested to produce minerals like soda ash. Kelp rapidly increased in price, so in 1817, the estate factors reduced the size of each tenancy (for example, Cleadale was re-arranged into 28 plots), to stop their tenants from becoming self-sufficient and forcing them to also harvest kelp in order to break even. However, soon after the creation of these smaller tenancies (crofts), foreign mineral supplies were re-introduced, as the Napoleonic Wars had ended. The kelp price crashed and the crofters struggled to avoid destitution.

In 1821, several families voluntarily emigrated to Nova Scotia to escape both rising rents and crushing poverty; they settled on a high plateau near the coast of the Northumberland Strait, which they named Eigg Mountain. Meanwhile, like many other Anglo-Scottish landlords during the Highland Clearances, Ranald George Macdonald, 19th Chief of Clanranald issued orders to evict the whole village of Cleadale, and use the land for sheep; both to cover his debts and to continue funding his extremely extravagant spending.

According to a 1964 oral history interview with Eigg seanchaidh Donald Archie MacDonald, Aonghas Lathair MacDhòmhnaill (Angus MacDonald, 2nd of Laig), the grandson of iconic poet Alasdair Mac Mhaighstir Alasdair, then held the tack of Eigg and gained local infamy by beginning the eviction from Cleadale; while intending to assign the land afterwards to his brother-in-law as a rented sheep farm. When severe hardships fell upon Aonghas Lathair and his family, which resulted in the tacksman committing suicide, the old people of Eigg blamed the family's misfortune on the curse that was said to have been put on them by the women whom he had evicted from Cleadale.

However, in 1827 the Ranald George Macdonald found someone willing to purchase Eigg, and cancelled further evictions. After 800 years, Clan Ranald rule of Eigg was at an end.

Later lairds 

The purchaser and new owner of Eigg was one Dr. Hugh MacPherson, and for a while island society carried on normally. The Scottish geologist and writer Hugh Miller visited the island in the 1840s and wrote a long and detailed account of his explorations in his book The Cruise of the Betsey (published in 1858). Miller was a self-taught geologist; so the book contains detailed observations of the geology of the island, including the Sgùrr and the singing sands. He described the islanders of Eigg as "an active, middle-sized race, with well-developed heads, acute intellects, and singularly warm feelings". He described seeing the bones of adults and children in family groups with the charred remains of their straw mattresses and small household objects still in Massacre Cave; after reading this description, Sir Walter Scott was so appalled that he started a fund for Christian burial, which resulted in the bodies' removal.

In 1847, ongoing rackrenting and the resulting financial woes of the islanders were compounded by the Highland Potato Famine. Furthermore, Dr. MacPherson decided to evict his tenants en masse and replace them with herds of sheep, as the price of wool had recently undergone substantial increases.

In 1853, the whole village of Gruilin – fourteen families – were evicted and forced by Dr. MacPherson to leave Eigg. The whole village of Brae was similarly cleared in 1858. In 1862, Dr. MacPherson built Sandavore church to serve Eigg's remaining Church of Scotland residents.

The isle of Eigg has a much wider importance for its influence on the rest of the Catholic Church in Scotland. From Donald MacLeod, a Catholic seanchaidh from Eigg resident in Oban, the poet Fr. Allan MacDonald collected multiple Catholic hymns and works of oral poetry in Scottish Gaelic. Fr. MacDonald supplemented these with several of his own compositions and translations and anonymously published a Gaelic hymnal in 1893.

At the end of the century, in 1893, Dr. MacPherson sold Eigg to Lawrence Thompson, who built a church for the Roman Catholics of the island (St. Donnan's church in Cleadale).

After being sold by Thompson in 1917, the island passed through various hands, including a cabinet minister, until being purchased by Keith Schellenberg. Unlike his predecessors, who had sought to use the resources of the island for their own power, profit, or leisure, Schellenberg had conservationist motives; he wished to restore its listed buildings, and preserve the natural environment.

Community buy-out

In the early 1990s, a fire at Schellenberg's home on the island destroyed a 1920s Rolls-Royce; Police suspected the fire was due to arson. Some locals claimed that since the late 1980s, he had neglected homes, closed the community hall, and restricted leases. While admitting that he had closed the community hall (but only in the evenings), and had refused to continue one particular lease, he told the press that "drunken hippies and drop-outs" were unfairly branding him a despot. In 1994, now in his 60s, Schellenberg concluded that trying to conserve the island was not worth facing violent intimidation for, and in the following year sold it to Gotthilf Christian Eckhard Österle from Germany who styled himself "Professor Marlin Eckhard-Maruma" or simply "Maruma" and who claimed to an artist; Schellenberg retained ownership of the 18th century Manse.

Nevertheless, by then a community trust had been formed by the Highland Council, the Scottish Wildlife Trust, and a number of residents – particularly those newly moved to the island – with a view to buying Eigg from the laird. In 1997, this Isle of Eigg Heritage Trust persuaded Eckhard to sell, and bought it from him. The ceremony to mark the handover took place a few weeks after the 1997 General Election and was attended by the Scottish Office Minister, Brian Wilson, a long-standing advocate of land reform; he used the occasion to announce the formation of a Community Land Unit within Highlands and Islands Enterprise to support further land buy-outs in the region.

Between then and the 2011 census, the ordinarily resident population expanded from 65 to 83; this increase of 24 percent (six times greater than for the Scottish islands as a whole) was principally formed by young people who moved to Eigg to set up in business, as well as a handful of former residents returning to the island. However, by 2003, the residents' representatives on the trust's board were entirely people who had moved to the island since the trust took over.

A few longstanding residents complained that the trust focused on the new residents, while ignoring the concerns of the families who had lived on the island for generations; for example, they complained that new mains power connections, and housing provision, was given to the families of trust members, not indigenous islanders. One islander from an old Eigg family declared that the trust "is not a democracy ... it is the mafia". More recently, more positive articles have been published, showing a different picture of the island.

Eigg was featured on the American television program 60 Minutes in November 2017 and an extended feature on its companion web site 60 Minutes Overtime in July 2018.

In its 2019 coverage of the island, National Geographic provided this summary of the ownership and current situation: "after years of neglect by the previous laird, or estate owner, the people gained ownership themselves in 1997. Now, visitors to the nicknamed “People’s Republic of Eigg” contend with nothing more dangerous than negotiating walking territory with sheep or engaging in cheeky yet informative banter with Charlie Galli, the sole taxi driver and self-proclaimed 'Eigg Gazette'" ... there is a single main road ... and a single stoplight ... to alert everyone when electricity is running low ... humble attractions like the tiny post-office-turned-museum detailing island history; a wee, closet-size shed boasting handcrafted curiosities for sale by the honor system; herds of distrustful sheep; and pit stops such as “Rest and Be Thankful,” a patio tea garden open only when the sun shines.

Economy and transport

Tourism is important to the local economy, especially in the summer months, and the first major project of the Heritage Trust was An Laimhrig, a new building near the jetty to house the island's shop and post office, Galmisadale Bay restaurant and bar, a craft shop, and toilet and shower facilities, which are open 24 hours a day.  A'Nead Hand Knitwear is a new island business making garments such as cobweb shawls and scarves.

Conde Nast Traveller particularly recommends that visitors explore the Singing Sands beach, "dark Cathedral and Massacre caves, the abandoned village of Grulin or the island’s most distinctive sight, the near vertically-sided volcanic plug of An Sgùrr".

There are two ferry routes to the island.  There is a sheltered anchorage for boats at Galmisdale in the south of the island. In 2004 the old jetty there was extended to allow a roll-on roll-off ferry to dock. The Caledonian MacBrayne ferry  sails a circular route around the four "Small Isles"—Eigg, Canna, Rùm and Muck from the fishing port of Mallaig. Arisaig Marine also runs a passenger ferry called the MV Sheerwater from April until late September from Arisaig on the mainland.

A beer brewery called Laig Bay Brewing was recently set up on the island.

In November 2017, a crew from the American television news magazine 60 Minutes visited Eigg. Its report stated that there was "one grocery shop, one primary school for five students and one pub at the tea room down by the wharf. The island's tiny electrical grid powers it all ... a combination of wind, hydroelectric and solar".

National Geographic's April 2019 coverage suggested that visitors should arrive via Caledonian MacBrayne (CalMac) ferry from Mallaig and Arisaig and explore by foot or bicycle or hitchhiking. Various types of rental accommodations were available. Sources for food included the Isle of Eigg Shop and Eigg Organics or communal dining places: Galmisdale Café and Bar and Lageorna. Because of the worldwide COVID-19 pandemic, facilities for tourists were closed, and visitors were being asked not to come to the island, during much of 2020 and into 2021.

Electrification project
The Heritage Trust provisioned a mains electricity grid, powered from near 100% renewable energy sources. Previously, the island was not served by mains electricity and individual crofthouses had wind, hydro or diesel generators and the aim of the project is to develop an electricity supply that is environmentally and economically sustainable.

The new system incorporates a 9.9 kWp PV system, three hydro generation systems (totalling 112 kW) and a 24 kW wind farm supported by stand-by diesel generation, ultra-capacitors, flywheels and batteries to guarantee continuous availability of power. A load management system has been installed to provide optimal use of the renewables. This combination of solar, wind and hydro power should provide a network that is self-sufficient and powered 98 percent from renewable sources. On 1 February 2008 the system was switched on.

Eigg Electric generates a finite amount of energy and so Eigg residents agreed from the outset to cap electricity use at 5 kW at any one time for households, and 10 kW for businesses. If renewable resources are low, for example when there is less rain or wind, a "traffic light" system asks residents to keep their usage to a minimum. The traffic light reduces demand by up to 20 percent and ensures that there's always enough energy for everyone.

The Heritage Trust has formed a company, Eigg Electric Ltd, to operate the new £1.6 million network, which has been part funded by the National Lottery and the Highlands and Islands Community Energy Company.

Other sustainability projects

In September 2008, Eigg began a year-long series of projects as part of their success as one of ten finalists in NESTA's Big Green Challenge. While the challenge finished in September 2009, the work to make the island "green" is continuing with solar water panels, alternative fuels, mass domestic insulation, transport and local food all being tackled. In May 2009, the island hosted the "Giant's Footstep Family Festival", which included talks, workshops, music, theatre and advice about what individuals and communities can do to tackle climate change.

In January 2010, Eigg was announced as one of three joint winners in NESTA's Big Green Challenge, winning a prize of £300,000. Eigg also won the prestigious UK Gold Award in July 2010.

Lighthouse

It is a minor light among those owned by Northern Lighthouse Board but day-to-day management rests with the Isle of Eigg Heritage Trust. The light emits a white flash every 6 seconds.

Wildlife

An average of 130 species of birds are recorded annually. The island has breeding populations of various raptors: golden eagle, buzzard, peregrine falcon, kestrel, hen harrier and short and long-eared owl. Great northern diver and jack snipe are winter visitors, and in summer cuckoo, whinchat, common whitethroat and twite breed on the island.

See also

 Religion of the Yellow Stick
 List of lighthouses in Scotland
 List of Northern Lighthouse Board lighthouses
 List of community buyouts in Scotland

References
Notes

Citations

General references
 Banks, Noel, (1977) Six Inner Hebrides. Newton Abbott: David & Charles.

External links

 The island's website
 Geology of Eigg
 BBC Radio 4 – Open Country
 BBC Action Network - My story: Bringing power to the people
 Ashden Awards Case Study, video and photographs 
 Book about the role of incomers on the island and photogallery
 The Cruise of the Betsey- Account of Miller's voyage.
 

 
Islands of the Inner Hebrides
Community buyouts in Scotland
Extinct volcanoes
Nature reserves in Scotland
Paleogene volcanism
Volcanoes of Scotland
Renewable energy in Scotland
Islands of Highland (council area)
Small Isles, Lochaber